Łojki  is a village in the administrative district of Gmina Grajewo, within Grajewo County, Podlaskie Voivodeship, in north-eastern Poland.

The village has an approximate population of 80.

References

Villages in Grajewo County